Garfunkel is a Jewish surname that derives from Yiddish גאָרפֿינקל (gorfinkl), German Karfunkel, both ultimately from Latin Carbuncle  (an archaic term for a number of red gemstones, usually red garnet), and may refer to:

 Art Garfunkel, American singer, poet and actor, best known as half of the folk music duo Simon & Garfunkel 
Garfunkel (album), 1988 compilation album by Art Garfunkel
 Jerome Garfunkel, American computer scientist notable for his work on COBOL, brother of Art Garfunkel 
 Sol Garfunkel, American mathematician
 Leib Garfunkel, Jewish advocate, journalist, politician in Lithuania.
 Garfunkel and Oates, American comedy-folk duo being Riki Lindhome and Kate Micucci
 Riki Lindhome aka Garfunkel
 Garfunkel and Oates (TV series), American comedy television series created by and starring the members of the titular musical duo above
Garfunkel's Restaurant, small chain of restaurants largely in the London, England area, but with branches in both Bath and Edinburgh

See also 
 Karfunkel
 Garfinkel
 Finkelstein
 Finkel

Germanic-language surnames
Jewish surnames
Yiddish-language surnames